Onaç can refer to:

 Onaç, Ilgaz
 Onaç, İskilip
 Onaç, Mustafakemalpaşa
 Onaç spring minnow
 Onaç-1 Dam
 Onaç-2 Dam